This article lists the official squads for the 1991 Women's Rugby World Cup in Wales.

Pool 1

New Zealand
Head Coach: Laurie O’Reilly

Canada

Wales

Pool 2

France

Sweden

Japan

Pool 3

United States
Head Coach: Kevin O'Brien
Coach: Chris Leach
Women’s Chair: Jami Jordan

Netherlands

Soviet Union
Coach: Vladimir Kobsev

Pool 4

England
Coach: Steve Dowling
Coach: Steve Peters
Coach: Simon Crabb

Italy

Spain

References

Rugby World Cup (women's) squads